Matthew Hostettler (born July 17, 1986) is an American politician from the state of Indiana. He serves in the Indiana House of Representatives for District 64. He is a member of the Republican Party.

Hostettler is the son of John Hostettler. He worked for CountryMark. In 2018, he ran for the Indiana House and won the Republican Party primary election in 2018 over two opponents. He did not face a Democrat in the general election.

References

External links

Living people
People from Gibson County, Indiana
Republican Party members of the Indiana House of Representatives
1986 births
21st-century American politicians
Purdue University alumni